Diadegma albicinctum is a wasp first described by Walley in 1967. No subspecies are listed.

References

albicinctum
Insects described in 1967